Ö3 Austria Top 40 is the official Austrian singles chart, as well as the radio show which presents it, aired Tuesdays on Hitradio Ö3. The show presents the Austrian singles, ringtones and downloads chart. It premiered on 26 November 1968 as Disc Parade and was presented by Ernst Grissemann. The show has had other names and other presenters, as detailed below.

The weekly number-ones are released by Musikmarkt and GoTV.

History 
From 1980 to 7 January 1990, the mixed listening and sales parade Hit wähl mit was broadcast on Sunday evening, starting with an hour of 15 chart placements and six new releases. The longest broadcast time was two hours with 25 chart placements and eight new releases.

Ö3 Top-30 
On 12 January 1990, the pure sales hit parade Ö3 Top-30 was introduced on Ö3. It was presented by Udo Huber on Saturday evening from 6:00 p.m. to 8:00 p.m. and lasted two hours. The first number 1 in the sales hit parade was the title "All Around the World" by Lisa Stansfield. The sales data collection as the basis for the shipment was carried out until the beginning of 1999 by the copyright company Austro Mechana, which is responsible for the license fees for the mechanical reproduction.

Ö3 Austria Top 40 
On 15 September 1995, the hit parade was expanded to 40 seats and the airtime to three hours. The Ö3 Austria Top 40 were created. The sales data collection as the basis for the shipment was initially carried out by the copyright company Austro Mechana. From April 1999, the data were collected by GfK Entertainment charts|Media Control, but since 2003, GfK Entertainment (founded as Media Control GfK International) has been creating the charts.

"Time to Say Goodbye" (performed by Sarah Brightman and Andrea Bocelli) was the number 3 of the Ö3 Austria Top 40 on 10 January 1997. With this title, "Mr. Hit Parade" Udo Huber became the long-time moderator of the Austrian hit parade. His successor was Martina Kaiser, who moderated until 28 December 2001. Matthias Euler-Rolle then took over until 30 April 2004 and was replaced by Gustav Götz, who hosted his last broadcast on 14 March 2014. From 21 March 2014 on Elke Rock and occasionally Thomas Filzer (until 6 July 2018) and Tarek Adamski (since 18 August 2017) have been moderating. Since 2 March 2021, Jana Petrik and Tarek Adamski are the new moderators of the Show.

Until 27 September 2019, the "Ö3 Austria Top 40" was broadcast on Friday from 7 p.m. to 10 p.m. From 6 October 2019 to 28 February 2021, the show was on Sundays from 16:00 to 19:00. Since 2 March 2021 the show has been on every Tuesday from 22:00 to 24:00.

Charts published
Four charts are currently published:
Ö3 Austria Top 40 Singles – a Top 75 listing
Ö3 Austria Top 40 Longplay (Albums) – a Top 75 listing
Ö3 Austria Top 20 Compilation – including releases as Diverse Interpreten (Various artists)
Ö3 Austria Top 10 DVD

Ö3 Austria Top 75
Note that the online version of the chart at https://oe3.orf.at/charts/stories/oe3austriatop40/ still lists 75 top positions and are known by various outlets and presentations as Ö3 Austria Top 75, but charts.orf.at still labels itself as Ö3 Austria Top 40 and broadcast versions only quote the top 40 with the rest of the positions 41 to 75 considered as "bubbling under".

List of number one hits
List of Austrian number-one hits

Presenters 
Between 1968 and 2007, the names of the show were Disc Parade, Die Großen 10 von Ö3, Pop Shop, Hit wähl mit, Die Großen 10, Ö3 Top-30, and Ö3 Austria Top 40.

References

External links 
Official Austrian singles chart
Ö3 Austria Top 75
Austrian chart archive

Austrian record charts
Music chart shows